John Smythe Hall (August 7, 1853 – January 8, 1909) was a Canadian lawyer, politician, and editor.

Born in Montreal, the son of John Smythe Hall, a lumber merchant, and Emma Brigham, he attended Bishop's College School in Lennoxville, Quebec and received a Bachelor of Law degree from McGill University in 1875. He was called to the Quebec Bar in 1876 and then started a law career which would see him become a principal partner of the law firm Hall, Cross, Brown, and Sharp.

He was first elected to the Legislative Assembly of Quebec in the 1886 election for the riding of Montréal-Ouest. A Conservative, he was acclaimed in the 1890 election in the riding of Montréal division no. 5 and was re-elected in the 1892 election. He was defeated in the 1897 election. In 1891, he was appointed provincial treasurer in the cabinet of Charles-Eugène Boucher de Boucherville and served in the cabinet of Louis-Olivier Taillon.

After being ill and spending time to recover in Atlantic City, New Jersey and Denver, Colorado, Hall moved to Calgary, Alberta where he became editor-in-chief of the Calgary Herald. He also opened a law firm, called Hall and Stewart. He became a member of the Calgary Municipal Council and a city solicitor. He died in Calgary in 1909 and was buried in Montreal.

References

See also 
List of Bishop's College School alumni

1853 births
1909 deaths
Politicians from Montreal
Anglophone Quebec people
Canadian newspaper editors
Canadian male journalists
Journalists from Montreal
Bishop's College School alumni
Conservative Party of Quebec MNAs
Lawyers from Montreal
McGill University Faculty of Law alumni
Calgary city councillors